is a private university in Minobu, Yamanashi, Japan. The predecessor of the school was founded in 1556, and it was chartered as a university in 1994.

External links
 Official website 

1556 establishments in Japan
Private universities and colleges in Japan
Buddhist universities and colleges in Japan
Universities and colleges in Yamanashi Prefecture
Minobu, Yamanashi
Nichiren-shū